The emperors of the Han dynasty were the supreme heads of government during the second imperial dynasty of China; the Han dynasty (202 BC – 220 AD) followed the Qin dynasty (221–206 BC) and preceded the Three Kingdoms (220–265 AD). The era is conventionally divided between the Western Han (202 BC – 9 AD) and Eastern Han (25–220 AD) periods.

The Han dynasty was founded by the peasant rebel leader (Liu Bang), known posthumously as Emperor Gao (r. 202 –195 BC) or Gaodi. The longest reigning emperor of the dynasty was Emperor Wu (r. 141–87 BC), or Wudi, who reigned for 54 years. The dynasty was briefly interrupted by the Xin dynasty of the former regent Wang Mang, but he was killed during a rebellion on 6 October 23 AD. The Han dynasty was reestablished by Liu Xiu, known posthumously as Emperor Guangwu (r. 25–57 AD) or Guangwu Di, who claimed the throne on 5 August 25 AD. The last Han emperor, Emperor Xian (r. 189–220 AD), was a puppet monarch of Chancellor Cao Cao (155–220 AD), who dominated the court and was made King of Wei. On 11 December 220, Cao's son Pi usurped the throne as Emperor Wen of Wei (r. 220–226 AD) and ended the Han dynasty.

The emperor was the supreme head of government. He appointed all of the highest-ranking officials in central, provincial, commandery, and county administrations. He also functioned as a lawgiver, the highest court judge, commander-in-chief of the armed forces, and high priest of the state-sponsored religious cults.

Naming conventions

Emperor

In ancient China, the rulers of the Shang (c. 1600 – c. 1050 BC) and Zhou (c. 1050 – 256 BC) dynasties were referred to as kings (王 wang). By the time of the Zhou dynasty, they were also referred to as Sons of Heaven (天子 Tianzi). By 221 BC, the King of Qin, Ying Zheng, conquered and united all the Warring States of ancient China. To elevate himself above the Shang and Zhou kings of old, he accepted the new title of emperor (皇帝 huangdi) and is known to posterity as the First Emperor of Qin (Qin Shi Huang). The new title of emperor was created by combining the titles for the Three Sovereigns (Sanhuang) and Five Emperors (Wudi) from Chinese mythology. This title was used by each successive ruler of China until the fall of the Qing dynasty in 1911.

Posthumous, temple, and era names
From the Shang to Sui (581–618 AD) dynasties, Chinese rulers (both kings and emperors) were referred to by their posthumous names in records and historical texts. Temple names, first used during the reign of Emperor Jing of Han (r. 157–141 BC), were used exclusively in later records and historical texts when referring to emperors who reigned during the Tang (618–907 AD), Song (960–1279 AD), and Yuan (1271–1368 AD) dynasties. During the Ming (1368–1644 AD) and Qing (1644–1911 AD) dynasties, a single era name was used for each emperor's reign and became the preferred way to refer to Ming and Qing emperors in historical texts.

Use of the era name was formally adopted during the reign of Emperor Wu of Han (r. 141–87 BC), yet its origins can be traced back further. The oldest method of recording years—which had existed since the Shang—set the first year of a ruler's reign as year one. When an emperor died, the first year of a new reign period would begin. This system was changed by the 4th century BC when the first year of a new reign period did not begin until the first day of the lunar New Year following a ruler's death. When Duke Huiwen of Qin assumed the title of king in 324 BC, he changed the year count of his reign back to the first year. For his newly adopted calendar established in 163 BC, Emperor Wen of Han (r. 180–157 BC) also set the year count of his reign back to the beginning.

Since six was considered a lucky number, Han Emperors Jing and Wu changed the year count of their reigns back to the beginning every six years. Since every six-year period was successively marked as yuannian (元年), eryuan (二元), sanyuan (三元), and so forth, this system was considered too cumbersome by the time it reached the fifth cycle wuyuan sannian (五元三年) in 114 BC. In that year a government official suggested that the Han court retrospectively rename every "beginning" with new characters, a reform Emperor Wu accepted in 110 BC. Since Emperor Wu had just performed the religious feng (封) sacrifice at Mount Taishan, he named the new era yuanfeng (元封). This event is regarded as the formal establishment of era names in Chinese history. Emperor Wu changed the era name once more when he established the 'Great Beginning' (太初 Taichu) calendar in 104 BC. From this point until the end of Western Han, the court established a new era name every four years of an emperor's reign. By Eastern Han there was no set interval for establishing new era names, which were often introduced for political reasons and celebrating auspicious events.

Regents and empress dowagers

At times, especially when an infant emperor was placed on the throne, a regent, often the empress dowager or one of her male relatives, would assume the duties of the emperor until he reached his majority. Sometimes the empress dowager's faction—the consort clan—was overthrown in a coup d'état. For example, Empress Lü Zhi (d. 180 BC) was the de facto ruler of the court during the reigns of the child emperors Qianshao (r. 188–184 BC) and Houshao (r. 184–180 BC). Her faction was overthrown during the Lü Clan Disturbance of 180 BC and Liu Heng was named emperor (posthumously known as Emperor Wen). Before Emperor Wu died in 87 BC, he had invested Huo Guang (d. 68 BC), Jin Midi (d. 86 BC), and Shangguan Jie (上官桀)(d. 80 BC) with the power to govern as regents over his successor Emperor Zhao of Han (r. 87–74 BC). Huo Guang and Shangguan Jie were both grandfathers to Empress Shangguan (d. 37 BC), wife of Emperor Zhao, while the ethnically-Xiongnu Jin Midi was a former slave who had worked in an imperial stable. After Jin died and Shangguan was executed for treason, Huo Guang was the sole ruling regent. Following his death, the Huo-family faction was overthrown by Emperor Xuan of Han (r. 74–49 BC), in revenge for Huo Guang poisoning his wife Empress Xu Pingjun (d. 71 BC) so that he could marry Huo's daughter Empress Huo Chengjun (d. 54 BC).

Since regents and empress dowagers were not officially counted as emperors of the Han dynasty, they are excluded from the list of emperors below.

List of emperors

Below is a complete list of emperors of the Han dynasty, including their personal, posthumous, and era names. Excluded from the list are de facto rulers such as regents and empress dowagers.

Timeline

Legend:
  denotes Western Han monarchs
  denotes Han monarchs following the collapse of the Xin dynasty but prior to the Eastern Han
  denotes Eastern Han monarchs

See also

Dynasties in Chinese history
List of Chinese monarchs

Notes

Footnotes

References

 

.

External links
Chinese History - Han Dynasty 漢 (206 BC-8 AD, 25–220) emperors and rulers, from Chinaknowledge.de

 01
Han
Lists of leaders of China